Sir James Lamb Weatherall  (28 February 1936 – 18 March 2018) was a Royal Navy officer who served as Her Majesty's Marshal of the Diplomatic Corps from 1992 to 2001.

Naval career
Educated at Gordonstoun School and the Royal Naval College, Dartmouth, Weatherall joined the Royal Navy in 1954. He was given command of the frigate HMS Andromeda in 1982, serving with her in the Falklands War, and took command of the aircraft carrier HMS Ark Royal in 1985. He joined the staff of the Supreme Allied Commander Europe in 1987 and then became Deputy Supreme Allied Commander Atlantic in 1989 before retiring in 1991.

In retirement he became Marshal of the Diplomatic Corps and a Trustee of the UK arm of the World Wide Fund for Nature. Weatherall also served as Warden of Box Hill School, a public school in Mickleham, near Dorking in Surrey, England.

Weatherall was knighted KBE in the 1989 Birthday Honours and appointed KCVO in the 2001 New Year Honours.

Family
In 1962 Weatherall married Hon. Jean Stewart Macpherson, daughter of Niall Macpherson, 1st Baron Drumalbyn; they had two sons and three daughters. She died on 15 December 2021.

References

External links
The Telegraph obituary, 28 March 2018.

1936 births
2018 deaths
People educated at Gordonstoun
Royal Navy vice admirals
Marshals of the Diplomatic Corps
Knights Commander of the Order of the British Empire
Knights Commander of the Royal Victorian Order